Pollux Peak is an  mountain summit located in Yellowstone National Park, in Park County, Wyoming, United States.

Description 
The peak is situated in the northeast quadrant of Yellowstone National Park and is the fourth-highest peak within the park. It is part of the Absaroka Range, which is a subset of the Rocky Mountains. Neighbors include Castor Peak  to the southwest, and Saddle Mountain  to the northwest on the opposite side of the Lamar River Valley. Pollux Peak is named for Pollux, the twin half-brother of Castor according to Greek mythology, and these two gods were considered protectors of travelers, of which there are many in Yellowstone Park. The mountain's name, which was officially adopted in 1930 by the United States Board on Geographic Names, was in use before 1899 when Henry Gannett published it in A Dictionary of Altitudes in the United States.

Climate 
According to the Köppen climate classification system, Pollux Peak is located in a subarctic climate zone with long, cold, snowy winters, and cool to warm summers. Winter temperatures can drop below −10 °F with wind chill factors below −30 °F. Precipitation runoff from the mountain drains into tributaries of the Lamar River.

See also
 List of mountains and mountain ranges of Yellowstone National Park

References

External links

 Weather forecast: Pollux Peak

Mountains of Park County, Wyoming
Mountains of Wyoming
North American 3000 m summits
Mountains of Yellowstone National Park